Miandarreh or Mian Darreh or Meyan Darreh may refer to:
Miandarreh, Golestan
Mian Darreh Jowkar, Kohgiluyeh and Boyer-Ahmad Province
Mian Darreh, Mazandaran
Miandarreh, Qazvin
Mian Darreh, Zanjan